Deadgirl is a 2008 American horror film written by Trent Haaga and directed by Marcel Sarmiento and Gadi Harel. It stars Shiloh Fernandez and Noah Segan as teenage boys who discover a naked, female zombie, played by Jenny Spain. When one of the boys wants to keep her as a sex slave and the other objects, their friendship is tested.

Plot
Rickie and J.T. are two high school seniors who gaze at the girls they wish they could get, especially Joann, the object of Rickie's affection, whom he has known since he was a child. One day, they decide to cut class and end up in an abandoned psychiatric hospital. They discover a mute, naked woman in the basement, chained to a table. While J.T. is interested in raping her, Rickie refuses and, after failing to dissuade J.T., leaves but, certain that his story will not be believed, tells no one about the woman. The next day, the two return to the basement where J.T. reveals that the woman is undead, which he discovered after attempting to kill her three times.

When Rickie finds that J.T. also invited their friend Wheeler to rape the woman, nicknamed "Deadgirl", he decides that it is time to free her. He is able to cut the chain on one hand before he hears J.T. and Wheeler approaching. He hides, and J.T. begins to rape her. After he notices that her hand is free, the woman attacks him and scratches his face.

Rickie asks Joann out on a date, knowing she has a boyfriend. She rejects him, and Joann's boyfriend Johnny and Johnny's friend Dwyer beat up Rickie and Wheeler. Wheeler rebuts that they "have their own pussy now" and Johnny throws them in his trunk, and drives to the asylum with Dwyer to see Deadgirl. Rickie convinces Johnny to force Deadgirl to perform oral sex on him, and Deadgirl bites Johnny's penis, infecting him. The next day, Johnny races to the bathroom during class and his intestines burst out of his body, leaving him in the same undead state as Deadgirl.

Having figured out that this is an infectious rotting disease, J.T. and Wheeler decide it is time to make a new Deadgirl with a fresh body. They lie in wait outside a gas station for a female victim. After an unsuccessful kidnapping, Joann confronts them about Johnny and they capture her. Rickie heads to the basement with a machete to free Deadgirl and finds Joann and Deadgirl tied up to each other, encircled by J.T. and Wheeler. J.T. tries to convince Rickie to let Joann be bitten while Wheeler starts to feel her up. Rickie defends her by slicing Wheeler's hand off while Joann unties Deadgirl, who feasts on Wheeler and J.T.

Rickie and Joann flee but cannot escape through the locked entrance. Rickie runs off to find an escape route, and when he returns, Joann is gone. He returns to the basement, where Deadgirl knocks him down, breaks down the door, and escapes outside. Rickie finds Joann and sees that J.T. has stabbed her in the back. J.T. urges Rickie to let him bite her so she will live undead. Rickie assures Joann that he loves her and will save her. She coughs blood into his face and rejects him again, telling him to "grow up," then asks for help.

Later, we see a cleanly-dressed Rickie living a normal life. He goes back to the asylum's basement, where,  tied up in bed in clean lingerie and romantic lighting, is his Deadgirl, Joann.

Cast

Production
Deadgirl was the only feature film by Hollywoodmade, a defunct Los Angeles-based production company. Deadgirl is rated R for "strong aberrant sexuality, graphic nudity, bloody violence, and pervasive language".

Film festivals
Deadgirl was publicly screened for the first time at the 2008 Toronto International Film Festival.

The film was also screened in 2008 at these film festivals:
 Fantastic Fest
 Sitges International Film Festival
 AFI Fest
 San Sebastian Fantasy Film Festival
 Cucalorus Film Festival
 Leeds International Film Festival
 Stockholm International Film Festival
 Melbourne Underground Film Festival
 Lone Star International Film Festival

Soundtrack
VCR Records was to release the Joseph Bauer-composed soundtrack (OST), in summer 2015 on Vinyl.

Reception
Deadgirl has a 29% approval rating on Rotten Tomatoes based on 17 reviews; the average rating is 4.52 out of 10.  Peter Debruge of Variety wrote that it "takes a disturbing adolescent male fantasy and glosses it up just enough to pass for a legitimate horror movie", though he complimented the acting and atmosphere in the early scenes.

The film was controversial and has been called misogynistic. In response, writer Haaga proposed a sequel about two women who find a naked, male zombie.  In 2012, Complex included the film in its list of 15 most uncomfortable moments of female nudity in film.

References

External links
 
  
 

2008 films
2008 independent films
2000s supernatural horror films
2000s teen horror films
American independent films
American supernatural horror films
American teen horror films
2000s English-language films
Films about rape in the United States
2000s American films
English-language horror films